Sikhiu is a district (amphoe) in the western part of Nakhon Ratchasima province, Thailand.

History
Originally known as Mueang Nakhon Chantuek, Sikhio is an ancient frontier city between the Thai-dominated Chao Phraya valley and the Lao-dominated Khorat Plateau. Nakhon Chantuek was controlled directly by the central government of Siam.

On 1 April 1898 it became a subordinate mueang of Nakhon Ratchasima. The district office was moved to Ban Nong Bua in 1901, and moved again to Ban Sikhio in 1906, both times because the original location was malaria infected.

In 1939 the district was renamed from Chanthuek to Sikhio.

Geography
The district is in the Dong Phaya Yen mountain range.

Neighbouring districts are (from the north clockwise): Dan Khun Thot, Sung Noen, and Pak Chong of Nakhon Ratchasima; Muak Lek of Saraburi province; and Lam Sonthi of Lopburi province.

Administration
The district is divided into 12 sub-districts (tambons), which are further subdivided into 170 villages (mubans). The town (thesaban mueang) Sikhio covers parts of tambons Sikhio and Mittraphap. There are another four sub-district municipalities (thesaban tambons), Lad Bua Khao covering parts of tambon Lad Bua Khao, and Khlong Phai covering parts of tambon Khlong Phai, Mueang Sikhio. Those parts of tambon Sikhio not covered by the town Sikhio, and Nong Nam Sai the full same-named sub-district. There are another 10 tambon administrative organizations (TAO).

References

External links
amphoe.com

Sikhio